Willem "Wim" Schouten (5 May 1878 – 18 January 1941) was a sailor from the Netherlands, who represented his native country at the 1928 Summer Olympics in Amsterdam. Schouten, as crew member on the Dutch 6 Metre Kemphaan, took the 4th place with helmsman Hans Pluijgers and fellow crew members: Hans Fokker, Carl Huisken and Roeffie Vermeulen.

Sources
 
 
 

1878 births
1941 deaths
Sportspeople from Alphen aan den Rijn
Dutch male sailors (sport)

Sailors at the 1928 Summer Olympics – 6 Metre
Olympic sailors of the Netherlands